In mathematics, the Russo–Dye theorem is a result in the field of functional analysis. It states that in a unital C*-algebra, the closure of the convex hull of the unitary elements is the closed unit ball.
The theorem was published by B. Russo and H. A. Dye in 1966.

Other formulations and generalizations

Results similar to the Russo–Dye theorem hold in more general contexts. For example, in a unital *-Banach algebra, the closed unit ball is contained in the closed convex hull of the unitary elements.

A more precise result is true for the C*-algebra of all bounded linear operators on a Hilbert space: If T is such an operator and ||T|| < 1 − 2/n for some integer n > 2, then T is the mean of n unitary operators.

Applications

This example is due to Russo & Dye, Corollary 1: If U(A) denotes the unitary elements of a C*-algebra A, then the norm of a linear mapping f from A to a normed linear space B is

In other words, the norm of an operator can be calculated using only the unitary elements of the algebra.

Further reading
  An especially simple proof of the theorem is given in:

Notes

C*-algebras
Theorems in functional analysis
Unitary operators